The Water House (full name: The Water House at South Bund) is a hotel housed in an old Japanese-style building of the 1930s built on the banks of the Huangpu River in Shanghai, China. Formerly the headquarters of the Japanese army during World War II, it was later used as a warehouse. The Water House at South Bund was the first top fashion design hotel in Shanghai.

Design Concept 
The 19-bedroom hotel's overall design goals were to fully blend inside and outside space and focus on public areas and private space coordination.

Architectural features 
The appearance of the Water House deliberately retains the original appearance of the building and the internal courtyard created new original style of window.

Furniture 
The Water House has a large collection of classic furniture with the hotel management and the designer selecting items from well known designers. These include Finn Juhl, "Danish Modern" style designer Arne Jacobsen, Danish furniture designer Hans Wegner, Milan designer Antonio Citterio and Kana Ishikawa, the Japanese designer who designed the noted Yohji Yamamoto boutique.

Interior design 
Title: The Water House at South Bund (水舍 - 南外滩精品酒店)

Design team: Neri & Hu Design and Research Office

Chief designers: Guo Xien, Hu Rushan

Collaborative designers: Debby Haepers, Dagmar Niecke, Max, Cai Chunyan, He Luomei

Architectural forms: Commercial space

The main building materials: Log, Weathering steel, Copper, Glass

Location: Maojiayuan Road NO.1-3, Zhongshang Road South, Huangpu District, Shanghai 200011

References 

Hotels in Shanghai